Galatea is an unincorporated community in Wood County, in the U.S. state of Ohio.

History
A post office called Galatea was established in 1887, and remained in operation until 1904. Galatea was located on the Toledo and Ohio Central Railroad.

References

Unincorporated communities in Wood County, Ohio
Unincorporated communities in Ohio